Rodina is a rural locality (a village) in Yorgvinskoye Rural Settlement, Kudymkarsky District, Perm Krai, Russia. The population was 48 as of 2010.

Geography 
It is located 19 km north-east from Kudymkar.

References 

Rural localities in Kudymkarsky District